The Australian Light Heavyweight Wrestling Championship was one of the first light heavyweight professional wrestling championship in Australia.

Title history

See also

Professional wrestling in Australia

References

Light heavyweight wrestling championships
Continental professional wrestling championships
National professional wrestling championships
Professional wrestling in Australia